The 1968 Scottish Cup Final was played on 27 April 1968 at Hampden Park in Glasgow and was the final of the 83rd staging of the Scottish Cup. Dunfermline Athletic and Hearts contested the match. Dunfermline Athletic won the match 3–1 with goals from two goals from Pat Gardner and a goal from Ian Lister, Hearts got on the scoresheet through a John Lunn own goal.

The game was Dunfermline's second and most recent Scottish cup triumph.

Hearts had the bulk of the play in the first half but were unable to press home their advantage, so the first half finished goalless. In the second half Dunfermline came out strongly, attacking down the wings and troubling Hearts' defence. Dunfermline went ahead in the 56th minute with a goal from Gardner. Three minutes later Hearts goalkeeper Cruickshank pulled down Paton, Lister scored the penalty to make it 2-0. Five minutes later Hearts replaced Jensen with Moller, this paid dividends as soon after Moller's cross was deflected into the box by Dunfermline's Lunn to make it 2-1. However, Hearts' revival was short-lived as Gardner scored a goal in the 73rd minute to make it 3-1.

Final

Teams

References

External links
SFA report
 Video highlights from official Pathé News archive

1968
Cup Final
Heart of Midlothian F.C. matches
Dunfermline Athletic F.C. matches
1960s in Glasgow
April 1968 sports events in the United Kingdom